Service of All the Dead is a crime novel by Colin Dexter, the fourth novel in his Inspector Morse series.

Setting
The novel describes a series of murders in and around St Frideswide's Church, Cornmarket, which corresponds to St Mary Magdalen Church, Magdalen Street rather than the much smaller St Michael's Church, Cornmarket. The original church of St Frideswide was at the Priory of St Frideswide, Oxford; the current church of that dedication is St Frideswide's Church on Botley Road, Oxford.

Plot summary
The novel is divided into four books. Each book takes its name from a book of the Bible and follows a different style of writing. Notably, the third is in the form of a statement taken from a witness and the fourth mostly takes the form of court proceedings.

The First Book of Chronicles 
The first book details the lives of the characters Lionel Lawson, Harry Josephs, Brenda Josephs, Paul Morris, Ruth Rawlinson and Peter Morris. It doesn't directly mention Philip Lawson but there are several indirect references to him as the tramp. This book sets up the various motives for the plot. It also highlights the jealousy and hatred some of the characters feel towards each other for various reasons.

The Second Book of Chronicles 
Morse is on furlough and by chance happens to visit St. Frideswide. There he learns of the murder of Harry Josephs and the subsequent suicide of Lionel Lawson. He finds out that Harry Josephs was first poisoned with morphine before being stabbed in the back. This curious fact sparks his attention and he begins to take an active interest in the case. When Inspector Bell, who was previously in charge of the case goes down with the flu, Morse & Lewis take official charge of the investigation. True to his usual self, Morse comes up with several theories, each of which is shown to be wrong with gathering evidence. Subsequently Morse locates the dead bodies of Paul Morris and Peter Morris by instincts.

When Brenda Josephs is also murdered, Morse finally sees the light in the case. He figures out that Ruth would be the next victim and the church (again) would be the scene of the crime. He then places Lewis in an opposite building to watch the church, and he hides in the church. Morse confronts the murderer, revealed to be Harry Josephs, atop the church tower. The two men struggle, and Harry falls from the tower to his death.

The Book of Ruth 
This book is about the statement given by Ruth to Lewis. She explains how she was hard up for money and agreed to help Lionel Lawson in a plot to murder Harry Josephs. She tries to put it across that she was never directly involved except as a witness to identify the dead man. On reading the statement, Morse rejects it as complete perjury and tears it up.

The Book of Revelation 
This book mostly takes the form of court proceedings as Morse reveals how the murderer Harry Josephs committed the crimes. He guesses that the first victim was Philip Lawson and Ruth's role was mainly to misidentify the body as that of Harry Josephs. He subsequently explains how Harry murdered the Morris father and son and then his wife Brenda. As for the question of Lionel Lawson, Morse suggests it was suicide. Ruth is sentenced to eighteen months imprisonment for perjury.

In the first closing scene, it is implied that Lionel Lawson was in fact murdered. In the last scene, Morse visits Ruth at her flat after her release and they start a romantic relationship.

Characters 

Rev Lionel Lawson: He is the St. Frideswide parish priest and said to be in his early forties. Throughout the novel, it is suggested that he is possibly gay but Morse concludes that he was not. He is said to be hard working and not interested in money a lot. He has his share of the family fortune secure in the bank whereas his brother Philip has wasted his share.
Philip Lawson: He is the brother of Lionel Lawson. While they aren't exactly alike, it is suggested that they could pass for each other to someone not familiar to them. He is jobless, has spent his share of family money and is trying to blackmail Lionel to give him money.
Harry Josephs: He is a retired commando and is now employed as the churchwarden. Lionel suspects he is stealing from the church collection box. Harry has also gambled and lost heavily on horses. He is having an affair with Ruth.
Brenda Josephs: Brenda is Harry's wife, a nurse at the Radcliffe infirmary. She is having an affair with Paul Morris, the music teacher/organist. Harry suspects this affair and follows her one day to confirm it. Brenda in turn, is aware of Harry's affair with Ruth.
Paul Morris: He is a widower living with his son Peter Morris. He is the local music teacher and also organist and choir master at the church. He has heard of some rumors about Lionel Lawson messing with the choir boys. He encourages his son Peter (who is part of the church choir) to come to him for help if required. He also tries to start another affair with a girl at school called Carole.
Peter Morris: He is 12-year-old son of Paul, and he is part of the church choir.
Miss Ruth Rawlinson: She cleans the Church and lives with her elderly disabled mother. Morse becomes interested in her during the initial stage of investigation but soon starts to suspect that she is hiding something. Eventually, she is the only member of the original plot who is left alive at the end of the book.

Publication history
1979, London: Macmillan , Pub date 18 October 1979, Hardback

Television adaptation
The book was adapted as the final episode of the first series of the Inspector Morse TV series, guest starring Angela Morant as Ruth, John Normington as Lionel and Maurice O'Connell as Harry. It closely follows the plot of the book but has events occur over a few days rather than several months. Since the series placed the story after The Dead of Jericho, where Bell was promoted to superintendent, the character only appears briefly as Morse's superior rather than Morse taking over the case from him, with Morse instead involved from the start. Lionel's surname was changed to Pawlen and his brother became Simon. The dedication of the church was changed to become St Oswald's. The postscript of Morse visiting Ruth after her release and them becoming lovers was replaced with him visiting her in her cell after sentencing and the device of Morse telling the press he was on the verge of making an arrest, prompting the attack on Ruth, was removed. The courtroom scene included a gavel on the judges bench, while British judges do not use a gavel.

References

Further reading 
 Bishop, David, The Complete Inspector Morse: From the Original Novels to the TV Series London: Reynolds & Hearn (2006)  
 Bird, Christopher, The World of Inspector Morse: A Complete A-Z Reference for the Morse Enthusiast Foreword by Colin Dexter, London: Boxtree (1998) 

1979 British novels
Novels by Colin Dexter
1987 British television episodes
Novels set in Oxford
Macmillan Publishers books
British novels adapted into television shows